Dimitrios Chantakias (born 4 January 1995) is a Greek professional footballer who plays as a centre-back for Zira in the Azerbaijan Premier League.

Career

Panetolikos and loan spells
Chantakias started his career at Panetolikos, signing his first professional contract in the summer of 2014.

In January 2015, he was sent on loan at Fokikos until the end of the season. He made his professional debut on 1 February 2015, in a 1–0 away loss against Lamia, playing full 90 minutes. After making ten appearances for the club, it announced that Chantakias would return to his parent club in June 2015.

He made his Panetolikos debut in a match against Atromitos on 7 December 2015, coming on as a substitute in the 72nd minute.

Cherno More
On 28 June 2019, Chantakias joined Bulgarian club Cherno More Varna.

Zira
On 5 September 2020, Chantakias signed a one-year contract with Zira FK.

References

External links
SuperLeague Profile

1995 births
Living people
Greek footballers
Greek expatriate footballers
Super League Greece players
Football League (Greece) players
First Professional Football League (Bulgaria) players
Azerbaijan Premier League players
Panetolikos F.C. players
Fokikos A.C. players
PAE Kerkyra players
PFC Cherno More Varna players
Zira FK players
Expatriate footballers in Bulgaria
Expatriate footballers in Azerbaijan
Association football defenders
Footballers from Agrinio